Lynbrook is a village in the Town of Hempstead in Nassau County, on the South Shore of Long Island, in New York, United States. The population was 19,427 at the 2010 census.

History
The area currently known as Lynbrook has had other names, including  Rechquaakie (originally), Parson's Corners, and Bloomfield. It was later named Pearsall's Corners, after Mr. Pearsall's General Store, because this store became a famous stagecoach stop for travelers coming from New York City to Long Island. Alternatively, it was called "Five Corners" because the stagecoach stop was at the crossing of Hempstead Avenue, Merrick Road, and Broadway. It became known as Lynbrook in 1894 and the village was incorporated in 1911. The name "Lynbrook" is derived by dividing "Brooklyn" into its syllables and transposing them, a tribute to the original home of many of the town's turn-of-the-century residents.

Since 1912, Lynbrook has been served by the Lynbrook Police Department. The Chief of the Department is Brian Palladino. Since 1879, the Lynbrook Volunteer Fire Department has served Lynbrook. The department has six firehouses around Lynbrook. The Chief of the Department is Christopher Kelly. Lynbrook is also served by its own Department of Public Works, which provides sanitation management. The superintendent is Phil Healey.

In 2008, three houses in Lynbrook were listed on the National Register of Historic Places: House at 251 Rocklyn Avenue, House at 474 Ocean Avenue, and House at 73 Grove Street. The Rockville Cemetery was listed in 2015.

Geography

Lynbrook neighbors Malverne to the north, Valley Stream to the west, Hewlett to the southwest, East Rockaway to the southeast, and Rockville Centre to the east.

Demographics

2010 census
As of the 2010 census  the population of the village was 85.3% White 77.7% Non-Hispanic White, 3.7% African American, 0.1% Native American, 4.5% Asian, 4.3% from other races, and 2.1% from two or more races. Hispanic or Latino of any race were 13% of the population.

2000 census
As of the census of 2000, there were 19,911 people, 7,369 households, and 5,239 families residing in the village. The population density was 9,960.8 people per square mile (3,843.8/km2). There were 7,570 housing units at an average density of 3,787.0 per square mile (1,461.4/km2). The racial makeup of the village was 92.08% White, 0.92% African American, 0.06% Native American, 2.99% Asian, 2.51% from other races, and 1.44% from two or more races. Hispanic or Latino of any race were 8.28% of the population.

There were 7,369 households, out of which 30.5% had children under the age of 18 living with them, 58.4% were married couples living together, 9.9% had a female householder with no husband present, and 28.9% were non-families. 24.8% of all households were made up of individuals, and 11.9% had someone living alone who was 65 years of age or older. The average household size was 2.66 and the average family size was 3.20.

In the village, the population was spread out, with 22.5% under the age of 18, 6.1% from 18 to 24, 30.4% from 25 to 44, 23.4% from 45 to 64, and 17.7% who were 65 years of age or older. The median age was 40 years. For every 100 females, there were 89.7 males. For every 100 females age 18 and over, there were 86.0 males.

The median income for a household in the village was $68,373, and the median income for a family was $88,023. Males had a median income of $50,795 versus $36,545 for females. The per capita income for the village was $27,211. About 2.5% of families and 4.2% of the population were below the poverty line, including 3.6% of those under age 18 and 7.5% of those age 65 or over.

Government

Village government 
As of May 2022, the Mayor of Lynbrook is Alan C. Beach, the Deputy Mayor is Michael N. Hawxhurst, and the Village Trustees are Robert Boccio, Michael N. Hawxhurst, Ann Marie Reardon, and Laura Ryder.

Representation in higher government 
Lynbrook is part of New York's 4th congressional district, which is currently represented by Republican Anthony D'Esposito. Lynbrook is also part of New York State Senate District 9. Furthermore, Lynbrook is part of the New York State 21st Assembly District, which is represented by Republican Brian F. Curran, who resides in Lynbrook.

Education

Public education 
School-aged children residing within the Village are eligible to attend one of the five public school districts that are within its boundaries: East Rockaway, Hewlett-Woodmere, Malverne, Lynbrook and Valley Stream School Districts, depending on where they reside within the village.

Lynbrook Union Free School District:
 Lynbrook Kindergarten Center
 West End Elementary School
 Marion Street Elementary School (located in East Rockaway)
 Waverly Park Elementary School (located in East Rockaway)
 Lynbrook South Middle School (located in Hewlett)
 Lynbrook North Middle School
 Lynbrook Senior High School

Malverne Union Free School District:
 Davison Avenue Elementary School

Private education 
The village is also home to Our Lady of Peace Roman Catholic Elementary School.

Transportation 
Long Island Rail Road service to the New York City boroughs of Manhattan, Queens and Brooklyn is available at the Lynbrook station, located off Sunrise Highway between Peninsula Boulevard and Broadway in the heart of the village. There is also the Westwood station, located off Whitehall Street. Lynbrook is also served by Nassau Inter-county Express's n25 and n31/32 bus route's in addition to the n4 one of the most popular and most used bus that goes through Lynbrook traveling from Jamaica Queens to Freeport NY.

In popular culture

Television appearances 
 The sitcom Everybody Loves Raymond is set in Lynbrook.<ref>Strickland, Carol. "Can Sitcom Make It With L.I. Setting?", The New York Times, December 1, 1996. Accessed June 1, 2022. "On the show, the frequent exterior shot of a Long Island Cape home, complete with two upstairs dormers, is a real Long Island house,' Mr. Rosenthal said. In the writer's mind, the show is set in Lynbrook rather than non-specific Nassau County."</ref> The fictional Marie and Frank Barone reside at 319 Fowler Avenue. Their son Raymond Barone and his family reside across the street at 320 Fowler Avenue, a real street in the center of town. The filming took place at Warner Bros. Burbank Studios in Burbank, California.
 In a Seinfeld episode, the gang mentions going to a mall in Lynbrook. There is no mall in Lynbrook, but Green Acres Mall is in nearby Valley Stream.
 Lynbrook's Trainland on Sunrise Highway was prominently featured in The Sopranos episode, "The Blue Comet" (aired June 3, 2007), with many scenes shot inside the store.

 Movies 
 Scenes from the motion picture After.Life, starring Christina Ricci, Liam Neeson and Justin Long, were filmed on Atlantic Avenue.

Notable people
 Tex Antoine (1923–1983), early TV weatherman who would draw cartoons with the weather reports.
 Raymond J. Barry (born 1939), actor, was raised in Lynbrook and attended Lynbrook High School
 Whittaker Chambers (1901–1961), Time magazine editor and former Communist-turned-anti-Communist activist, was raised in Lynbrook and lived there as an adult.Vinciguerra, Thomas. "Ghosts Rest at Whittaker Chambers Home" , The New York Times, March 30, 1997. Accessed June 1 , 2022. "But thanks to Sam Tanenhaus's Whittaker Chambers: A Biography (Random House), the controversial anti-Communist crusader has been recalled as a native son of Long Island – Lynbrook, to be precise, – where he grew up and to which he returned while working as the embattled foreign news editor of Time magazine."
 Alan Colmes (1950–2017), radio and television personality, was raised in Lynbrook.
 Edward Field, poet, was raised in Lynbrook and attended Lynbrook High School. 
 Joe Gatto, improv comedian, Impractical Jokers was a resident from Summer 2015 to 2019. 
 Bob "Captain Kangaroo" Keeshan (1927–2004) was born in Lynbrook
 Quint Kessenich, sportscaster for ABC and ESPN television covering lacrosse, basketball, football, hockey, wrestling and horse racing since 1993.
 Tony Kornheiser, Pardon the Interruption'' television personality,  was raised in Lynbrook
 Charles Nam, sociologist

References

External links

 Lynbrook official website

Hempstead, New York
Villages in New York (state)
Villages in Nassau County, New York